Gnomidolon opacicolle is a species of beetle in the family Cerambycidae. It was described by Napp and Martins in 1985.

References

Gnomidolon
Beetles described in 1985